{{DISPLAYTITLE:C6H8O2}}
The molecular formula C6H8O2 may refer to:

 Cyclohexanediones
 1,2-Cyclohexanedione
 1,3-Cyclohexanedione
 1,4-Cyclohexanedione
 Cyclotene (maple lactone)
 Methylene cyclopropyl acetic acid
 Parasorbic acid
 Sorbic acid